Puteri Indonesia Lingkungan (literally translates into: "Princess Indonesia Environment" or "Miss International Indonesia") is one of the beauty pageant title by Puteri Indonesia Org., the winners of Puteri Indonesia Lingkungan will represent Indonesia in one of the oldest Big Four international beauty pageants, Miss International.

Indonesia start its debut in pageantry on 1960. The first pageant appointing Indonesia's delegates to this contest was Miss Java held on 1960, 1968, and 1969. In the early 1970s the founder of Beauty Salon "Andy's Beauty", Mrs. Andi Nurhayati together with 7th Governor of Jakarta Special Capital Region, Mr. Ali Sadikin took off the franchise and organize "Puteri Indonesia" and appoint its Puteri Indonesia Lingkungan winner to Miss International.

Due to its absence regarding the governmental regulation towards pageantry from 1978 to 2006, Andi's Beauty loses its franchise to Miss International Pageant and is moving to Puteri Indonesia, a national pageant held by Mustika Ratu; Indonesia's oldest and biggest cosmetics herbal company. Since 2007, Puteri Indonesia sent Rahma Landy Sjahruddin, Puteri Indonesia Pariwisata 2006 or 2nd Runner-up Puteri Indonesia to represent Indonesia on Miss International. Because of Miss Asia Pacific International cancelled its contest, Puteri Indonesia Organization switched the title of Miss International Indonesia to Puteri Indonesia Lingkungan or 1st Runner-up Puteri Indonesia. Since 2008, Puteri Indonesia Lingkungan or 1st Runner-up Puteri Indonesia will automatically represent Indonesia on Miss International Beauty Pageants. The president-owner of Puteri Indonesia are The Highest Royal Family of Surakarta Sunanate, Mooryati Soedibyo and Putri Kuswisnuwardhani.

The reigning Puteri Indonesia Lingkungan 2022 is Cindy May McGuire of Jakarta, who was crowned on 27 May 2022 in Jakarta Convention Center. She will represent Indonesia at the 60th edition of Miss International beauty pageant.

Gallery of winners 
The winners of Puteri Indonesia Lingkungan (Miss International Indonesia)

Titleholders
This is a list of women who represented of Indonesia at the Miss International beauty pageant.
Color key

Number of wins by Province

Crossovers to other international pageants

Indonesia's Placement at Miss International

See also
Puteri Indonesia
Puteri Indonesia Pariwisata
Puteri Indonesia Lingkungan (in Bahasa Indonesia)
Miss International

Notes
Putu Ayu Saraswati is a doctor and Indonesian People's Consultative Assembly Ambassador.

References

Beauty pageants in Indonesia
Miss International
Indonesia

Puteri Indonesia
Indonesian awards
Lists of award winners
Lists of women in beauty pageants